The discography of American alternative rock band The Breeders consists of five studio albums, one live album, three extended plays, ten singles and twelve music videos. Kim Deal, then-bassist of American alternative rock band the Pixies, formed The Breeders as a side-project with Tanya Donelly, guitarist of American alternative rock band Throwing Muses. After recording a demo tape, The Breeders signed to the English independent record label 4AD in 1989. Their debut studio album Pod was released in May 1990, but was not commercially successful. After the revival of the Pixies and Throwing Muses in 1990, The Breeders became mostly inactive until the Pixies' breakup in 1993. With a new lineup, The Breeders released their Safari EP in 1992, followed by their second studio album Last Splash in 1993. Last Splash was The Breeders' most successful album; it peaked at number 33 on the United States Billboard 200 and was certified platinum by the Recording Industry Association of America in 1994. The album spawned the band's most successful single, "Cannonball". The single peaked at number 44 on the US Billboard Hot 100 and at number two on the Billboard Alternative Songs chart.

Following the release of the EP Head to Toe, The Breeders once again became inactive until 2002, when they released their third studio album, Title TK. It failed to match the previous success of Last Splash, and in 2004 the band were dropped from Elektra Records in the United States. Mountain Battles, the band's fourth studio album, was released on April 7, 2008. It peaked at number 98 on the Billboard 200.

Albums

Studio albums

Live albums

Extended plays

Singles 

Notes

Other appearances

Music videos

References

External links 
 The Breeders at AllMusic
 
 

Rock music group discographies
Discographies of American artists
Discography